Richwood is a town in Ouachita Parish, Louisiana, United States. The Town was incorporated December 31, 1974, under the provision of Louisiana Revised Statute 33:52. The Town operates under a form of government consisting of an elected mayor and a board of alder persons, which has five elected members. The Town provides garbage collection, street maintenance, drainage maintenance, and other health and welfare services, in addition to the administrative services provided to its residents. The population was 3,392 at the 2010 census.

Geography
Richwood is located in the southern portion of Ouachita Parish of Northeast Louisiana at  (32.459587, -92.075184).

Demographics

2020 census

As of the 2020 United States census, there were 3,881 people, 607 households, and 348 families residing in the town.

2000 census
As of the census of 2000, there were 2,115 people, 558 households, and 410 families residing in the town. The racial makeup of the town was 88.23% African American, 10.87% White, 0.57% Asian, 0.05% Native American, and 0.28% from two or more races. Hispanic or Latino of any race were 0.80% of the population.

There were 558 households, out of which 39.6% had children under the age of 18 living with them, 31.7% were married couples living together, 36.2% had a female householder with no husband present, and 26.5% were non-families. 22.8% of all households were made up of individuals, and 7.5% had someone living alone who was 65 years of age or older. The average household size was 2.87 and the average family size was 3.40.

In the town, the population was spread out, with 28.7% under the age of 18, 14.7% from 18 to 24, 33.8% from 25 to 44, 16.3% from 45 to 64, and 6.5% who were 65 years of age or older. The median age was 28 years. For every 100 females, there were 126.2 males. For every 100 females age 18 and over, there were 137.5 males.

The median income for a household in the town was $16,790, and the median income for a family was $17,661. Males had a median income of $17,284 versus $16,875 for females. The per capita income for the town was $10,190. About 41.7% of families and 42.7% of the population were below the poverty line, including 54.2% of those under age 18 and 44.1% of those age 65 or over.

See also 
 Verdiacee Goston

References

External links
 Richwood Progress Community Progress Site for Richwood, LA

Towns in Louisiana
Towns in Ouachita Parish, Louisiana
Towns in Monroe, Louisiana metropolitan area